They Came from Outer Space is an American science fiction comedy series that aired in syndication from October 1990 to March 1991. The series was created by Tom McLoughlin.

Synopsis
The series stars Dean Cameron as Bo, and Stuart Fratkin as Abe, two teenage fraternal twin aliens from the planet Crouton. They thwart their parents' plans to send them to Cambridge University, in Great Britain, and instead they decide to travel throughout California in their 1959 classic red Chevrolet Corvette, in an effort to pick up women and to learn more about life on Earth. They are pursued by a pair of bumbling U.S. Air Force officers, Lt Col. Tom Barker, and Lt. Pat "Monkey" Wilson, who would like to capture the two for scientific study.  Abe and Bo were constantly taking odd jobs to support themselves on their American road trip.

Characters
Abewosiak "Abe" (Stuart Fratkin) was the more responsible, and serious, of the two brothers.  Much is made about the fact that Abe is still a virgin, and wishes to remain so until he is married.  His primary concern throughout the series seems to be where their next meal will come from.  He frequently complains that he is hungry.  However, due to his high Croutonian metabolism he can eat large quantities of food and never gain weight.

Boximaxio "Bo" (Dean Cameron) was the more fun loving of the brothers.  His primary interest seemed to be how many women he could get to have sex with him.  He seldom thinks about the consequences of his actions and usually gets Abe and himself into trouble.  It was his idea to go to California (instead of Britain) when he read that his favorite centerfold lived in Malibu.  He would wrestle control of the space ship from Abe and crash inside a California junk yard.

Lt Col. Tom Barker (Alan Royal)  was an Air Force officer charged with tracking down any extraterrestrial on Earth and turning them over to be dissected.  He was resentful of the fact that he was working in the UFO hunter unit, because he believed that it was beneath someone of his rank to be doing the job.  It is implied that he was put in the unit as punishment for embarrassing a senior officer.  Barker believes that if he catches the brothers he will be transferred out of the unit and possibly made a general.

Before the start of the series, he caught a pair of Croutonian sisters, the Patoolas, on which the government experimented.  This is presumably how he knew about Crouton physiology and abilities.  Abe and Bo knew about the capture of the sisters and it was one of the reasons Abe did not want to come to the United States.

Lt. Pat "Monkey" Wilson (Christopher Carroll) was the other Air Force officer hunting aliens on the team.  Wilson most likely was demoted from a higher rank down to lieutenant, when he was put into the unit.  He got the nickname "Monkey", due to an embarrassing story that he was reluctant to share.  The Colonel generally referred to him only as Wilson, but would call him Monkey when he wanted to put him down.

Throughout the series neither officer managed to capture the Crouton brothers.  This was due to their own incompetence, and the brothers using their various abilities to outwit them.

Mom and Dad (Rosalee Mayeux and Victor Brandt) were Bo and Abe's parents back on the planet Crouton.  When they crash landed on Earth, the twins saved their galactic communication device.  This enabled them to communicate, in real time, with audio and video with their parents back on the planet Crouton.  A couple of episodes ended with the brothers telling their parents how things were going in "England".  To complete the illusion, they would often place a poster in back of them showing familiar British landmarks, such as Big Ben, Oxford University, or Tower Bridge, while playing "Rule Britannia" in the background.  However, they were once almost found out when their father noticed that the Hands of Big Ben had not moved in the several minutes that they were talking.

Crouton physiology
The only Croutonians shown during the season were the two brothers and video conferences they had with their parents.  Most of what is known about them comes from what they have said.
Considering the Air Force's knowledge about some of the Croutonian abilities, we can also assume that they learned some of this from the captured sisters that they had experimented on.

Basic physiology

Croutonians outwardly look like normal humans.  Of the four seen in the series, they all appeared to be Caucasian.  It is not known if they have other racial types on their home planet.

Despite their outward appearances they have several unique powers and abilities that distinguish them from humans.  These special powers use a lot of energy, which gives them an extraordinarily high metabolism.  A running gag in the series was how the two of them would eat an extremely large quantity of food often surprising or disgusting the humans around them.  It was not uncommon for them to literally eat an all-you-can-eat buffet out of all their food.  Each one of them could easily eat a whole large pizza pie and still be hungry afterwards.

Croutonians also appear to be able to eat as foods things that are toxic to humans.  In one incident they made a type of "Crouton cocktail".  The ingredients included mouthwash, liquid shoe polish and window cleaner fluid.

Another unique thing about all Croutonians is that they all are apparently born fraternal twins.  Throughout their lives the twins share an empathic bond, that enables them to each feel what is happening to the other, but not themselves.  For example, if you were to slap Bo, he would feel nothing, but Abe would feel pain and vice versa.  If you were to tickle Abe he would not react, but Bo would laugh.  This often lead to some farcical elements involving the brothers.  Even though they shared empathic abilities they apparently could not read each other's thoughts.  Though they were linked it appears as though when they were hungry they felt it themselves, as Abe would often say "I'm hungry", instead of "Bo, you're hungry."

Another common running gag involved what happened to Croutonians when sexually aroused.  Their bodies would make a sound like boiling water while giving off a thick white steam-like substance.  This would often lead people to falsely assume that the Croutonians were in fact on fire, and splash cold water on the "smoking" brother.  Due to their empathic link, it would cool off the other brother.  Bo preferred to explain it as there was low rolling fog coming in.  It is never explained if this is common in both genders or only male Croutonians.

Crouton powers

The Croutonians have several unique powers that are seen throughout the series.  The following is a list of powers that Bo and Abe exhibited.  Apparently, these powers are shared by all Croutonains.

Object Transference
Object transference was the most frequently used of their special powers.  This ability enabled the brothers to instantaneously teleport any inanimate object across the room.  This was done by the brothers linking each of their arms at the elbow, then with their free hand pointing at the object they would want to move.  For example, Bo would point at the object and Abe would point where they would want the object to transfer to or vice versa.  Then they would say the phrase "Boing" and the object would disappear from where Bo was pointing and appear where Abe was pointing.

The brothers had to agree which object was going to be transferred and which brother was going to point.  Neither could use this power without his brother.  In the course of the series they would transfer objects like food and bottles across the room.  On one occasion they were able to transfer electricity from an electrical outlet to a light bulb just by using object transference.

Inanimate Projection

This ability enables a Croutonian to temporarily place their consciousness into an inanimate object for a short period of time.  All they had to do was will it and their body would disappear as they would now be inside the object that they wanted.  Throughout the show's run they appeared inside objects ranging from fuzzy dice to toy robots.  Mobile objects such as vehicles or electronic objects such as televisions could be controlled by Croutons projected into them.  A Croutonian can only stay inside an object for approximately one minute or else they might get stuck in the object for several hours.  Bo once got stuck inside a massage table, an experience he quite enjoyed, but it left Abe feeling stiff.

Animal communication

This power gave them the ability to tune into another species' "frequency" in order to communicate with them using some form of telepathy.  What they would do is hold one hand up to or above the animal, with their palm facing the animal.  Occasionally, with their free hand they would use their fingers to tune into the animals thoughts, by moving their hand as if there was a knob near their ear.  Once they found the correct frequency they could understand and communicate with that particular animal.  Although a Crouton could hear the animals' thoughts, those around him (including his brother) understood nothing.  Some of the animals they communicated with include: dogs, a horse, birds, fish, and on one occasion a gorilla who could do John Wayne impersonations.

Energy transference

This ability allows one Croutonian to transfer some of his energy into another Croutonian.  To do this they first must clasp both of their hands while facing each other.  Then one can pass his energy into the other.  The effect on the one receiving the energy is that he is able to move almost at twice his normal speed, and have extremely quick reflexes.  The other one will move in an exaggerated slowness and with extremely slow reflexes.  It is not explained if the Croutonians must be related to use this ability or if they can transfer energy to anyone from Crouton.

Production notes

Theme song
The lyrics of the show's theme song were written by Gary Stockdale with Marie Cain, and performed by Stockdale, Cain, Terry Wood, and Michael Now.

Episodes

Home media
On February 14, 2012, Timeless Media Group released They Came from Outer Space- The Complete Television Series on DVD in Region 1.

References

External links

 
 

1990 American television series debuts
1991 American television series endings
1990s American comic science fiction television series
English-language television shows
First-run syndicated television programs in the United States
Television series by Universal Television
Television shows set in the United States